The Djerait were an indigenous Australian people of the Northern Territory

Language
The Djerait language was said to have been mutually intelligible with that of the Mulluk-Mulluk who spoke a Daly river language, being as distant as ancient Greek dialects were to each other. And it was also said to be interchangeable with that spoken by the Pongaponga.

Country
Neighbouring tribes were the Mulluk-Mulluk, the Madngella the Pongaponga and the Wogait.

People
The Jesuit missionary Donald Mackillop stated that the Djerait were a "small but intelligent tribe".

Some words
 yinnung delluk (bamboo nose stick)
 wennu. (conical helmet smeared with pipe clay and topped with a bone to which an emu plume is affixed)
 barang (dangerous night spirit, noseless and with blanks for facial eyes, with two organs on the back for seeing at great distances.'

Alternative names
 Tjerait
 Cherait, Cherite
 Sherait
 Jeerite
 Scherits
 Tjiras
 Paperbark natives

Notes

Citations

Sources

Aboriginal peoples of the Northern Territory